Disney Fantasy Online is a massively multiplayer online role-playing game developed by Netdragon marketed in China.

The game is in 2.5D perspective, and features assorted Disney characters such as Mickey Mouse, Minnie Mouse, Donald Duck, and Goofy.

References

2009 video games
Disney video games
Massively multiplayer online role-playing games
Netdragon games
Video games developed in China
Windows games
Windows-only games